The cantar is a form of classical Spanish canción, song or poem.

Cantar de mio Cid, "The Song of my Cid" 
Cantar de gesta, Spanish equivalent of the Old French medieval chanson de geste or "songs of heroic deeds"

Other
Cantar (album), a 1974 album by Gal Costa
Cantar caste, a Tamil caste found in Sri Lanka
Cantar, brand of French audio equipment maker Aaton